"Sous l'oeil de l'ange / Qu'est ce que ça te fout"  is third single from K.Maro's album La Good Life. The lyrics of the double A-side single are in French.

The music video clips for "Sous l'oeil de l'ange" and "Qu'est ce que ça te fout" were both shot in 2005.

Track listings
 CD single
 "Sous l'oeil de l'ange" — 3:31
 "Qu'est ce que ça te fout" — 3:31

Charts

References

External links
K'Maro's official website

2004 songs
2005 singles
K.Maro songs